Edmond Robinson, Jr. (born February 23, 1992) is an American football linebacker for the Arlington Renegades of the XFL. He played college football at Newberry. He was drafted by the Minnesota Vikings in the seventh round of the 2015 NFL Draft.

Early years
Robinson was born to parents, Edmond Robinson, Sr. and Rev. Annabelle Robinson, a pastor in the African Methodist Episcopal (AME) Church. He was raised in Wadmalaw Island, South Carolina, home to the last working tea plantation in the United States. He attended St. Johns High School in Johns Island, South Carolina, where he was a three-sport athlete in football, basketball and track.

College career
At Newberry, Robinson started 29 of 41 games, finishing his career with 200 tackles (137 solos), 2.5 sacks for minus 23 yards, 23.5 stops for losses of 80 yards and three quarter-back pressures. He also caused two fumbles and recovered three others, advancing two for a total of 16 yards.

In 2013, Robinson was named All-South Atlantic Conference First-team at linebacker. He had 69 total tackles (12 for loss), including 42 solo stops, 2.5 sacks, one forced fumble and an interception.

In 2014, Robinson was Newberry's leading tackler on the season with 68 tackles (7.5 for loss), five pass breakups, two fumble recoveries and a quarterback hurry.

Professional career

NFL Combine

Robinson's arm length of 34 inches and hand size of 101/4 inches ranked among the largest for linebackers at the combine. His vertical jump (37 inches), 40-yard dash (4.61 seconds) and standing broad jump (121 inches) all were top-10 performances among the 34 linebackers on hand.

Minnesota Vikings
Robinson was selected by the Minnesota Vikings in the seventh round, 232nd overall pick in the 2015 NFL Draft. He was the first NCAA Division II player to be selected in that year's draft. He is the first Newberry alumnus selected in the NFL Draft since 1974, when Greg Hartle was taken with the No. 251 overall pick in the 10th round by the then St. Louis Cardinals. He signed a four-year, $2,348,314 deal that included a $68,314 signing bonus that is all guaranteed.

In the Vikings' loss to the Arizona Cardinals in Week 15 of the 2015 season, Robinson started at strong-side linebacker with Anthony Barr out due to a groin injury and was credited with one tackle and a pass defensed. He played 26 of 67 snaps on defense as he came off the field in passing situations. A week later in the Vikings' blowout win over the New York Giants, he recorded five tackles despite playing just six snaps on defense.

On September 2, 2017, Robinson was released by the Vikings for final roster cuts.

New York Jets
Robinson was claimed off waivers by the New York Jets on September 3, 2017. He was waived/injured on September 16, 2017 and placed on injured reserve. He was released on December 19, 2017.

Arizona Cardinals
On December 22, 2017, Robinson was signed to the Arizona Cardinals' practice squad. He was promoted to the active roster on December 26, 2017. Robinson was waived by the Cardinals on September 1, 2018.

Arizona Hotshots
In 2018, Robinson signed with the Arizona Hotshots of the Alliance of American Football for the 2019 season. The league ceased operations in April 2019.

Houston Roughnecks
In October 2019, Robinson was picked by the Houston Roughnecks in the 2020 XFL Draft. After the 2020 XFL season was cut short, Robinson was placed on the reserve/other league list on March 28, 2020. He had his contract terminated when the league suspended operations on April 10, 2020.

Atlanta Falcons
On March 30, 2020, Robinson signed with the Atlanta Falcons of the NFL. He was waived on September 5, 2020, and signed to the practice squad the next day. He was elevated to the active roster on September 26, October 10, October 17, October 24, October 29, and November 7 for the team's weeks 3, 5, 6, 7, 8, and 9 games against the Chicago Bears, Carolina Panthers, Minnesota Vikings, Detroit Lions, Panthers, and Denver Broncos, and reverted to the practice squad after each game. On November 10, he was signed to the 53-man roster.

New York Jets (second stint)
On August 6, 2021, Robinson signed with the New York Jets. He was waived on August 24, 2021.

Seattle Seahawks
On November 16, 2021, Robinson was signed to the Seattle Seahawks practice squad.

Arlington Renegades 
On November 17, 2022, Robinson was drafted by the Arlington Renegades of the XFL.

Career statistics

References

External links
 Newberry Wolves bio

1992 births
Living people
African-American players of American football
American football linebackers
Arizona Cardinals players
Arizona Hotshots players
Atlanta Falcons players
Arlington Renegades players
Houston Roughnecks players
Minnesota Vikings players
New York Jets players
Newberry Wolves football players
People from Charleston County, South Carolina
Players of American football from South Carolina
Seattle Seahawks players
21st-century African-American sportspeople